New Bhubaneswar railway station (BBSN) serves the  northern part of the city of Bhubaneswar, the capital of the Indian state of Odisha. The station lies in the East Coast Railway zone of the Indian Railways. It has 7 platforms and 9 tracks. It was opened for public in July 2018. It is a satellite passenger terminal that is  located on the northern side between Mancheswar railway station and Barang railway station as Bhubaneswar railway station is located on the southern side of the city.

References

Khurda Road railway division
Railway stations in Bhubaneswar